The Coral Gables City Hall is a historic site in Coral Gables, Florida. It is located at 405 Biltmore Way. On July 24, 1974, it was added to the U.S. National Register of Historic Places.

The city hall was built in the Mediterranean Revival architectural style. It was completed in 1928. Phineas Paist and Harold Steward were the architects; Denman Fink was the artistic advisor. It is three stories tall, built of local limestone, has a stuccoed exterior, tile roof, central 3-stage clock tower, and a Corinthian colonnade. It was major element in the plan of George E. Merrick, founder of Coral Gables, to create a Spanish-Mediterranean city.

References

Sources

 Behar, Roberto M., ed. Coral Gables. Paris, France: Editions Norma, 1997. 
 Patricios, Nicholas N. Building Marvelous Miami. Gainesville, FL: University Press of Florida, 1994. .

External links

Dade County listings at National Register of Historic Places
Florida's Office of Cultural and Historical Programs
Dade County listings
Coral Gables City Hall

Buildings and structures in Coral Gables, Florida
National Register of Historic Places in Miami-Dade County, Florida
City and town halls in Florida
Clock towers in Florida
Historic American Buildings Survey in Florida
City and town halls on the National Register of Historic Places in Florida
Government buildings completed in 1928